Sabhakunwar is the current member of the Uttar Pradesh Legislative Assembly for Bhatpar Rani, constituency number 340. He became M.L.A. in May 2022. He belongs to the party BJP.

Office: Vidhayak Nivas, Bhatpar Rani

He fought his first election in 2002 for Vidhan sabha but lost. Since then he has fought many elections in 2007, 2012,  2013 (by-election), 2014 (Lok- sabha),  2017 but has lost all of them. His first win was in 2022 when he joined the BJP.

Born - Kukurghati, Uttar Pradesh

Hometown - Bhatpar Rani

References

Living people
Year of birth missing (living people)
Bharatiya Janata Party politicians from Uttar Pradesh
Uttar Pradesh MLAs 2022–2027